Big Daddy is a 1999 American comedy drama film directed by Dennis Dugan and written by Steve Franks, Tim Herlihy and Adam Sandler based on a story by Franks. It stars Sandler, Joey Lauren Adams, Jon Stewart, Rob Schneider, Dylan and Cole Sprouse  and Leslie Mann. The plot follows Sonny Koufax, a 32-year-old man who gets dumped by his girlfriend for not accepting responsibility. Sonny then tries to be responsible by adopting a five-year-old boy named Julian who appears on his doorstep.

Released on June 25, 1999, the film opened at No. 1 at the box office with a $41.5 million gross in its first weekend. It went on to be the seventh highest-grossing film of 1999, and was Sandler's highest-grosser domestically until Hotel Transylvania 2 (2015). The film was nominated for five Razzies and Sandler won the Worst Actor category.

Plot
In New York City, Sonny Koufax is a 32-year-old slacker and law school graduate who hasn't taken the bar exam, works one day a week as a toll booth attendant, and lives off a $200,000 compensation from a minor accident. His girlfriend Vanessa threatens to break up with him unless he takes more responsibility. His roommate Kevin Gerrity proposes to his podiatrist girlfriend Corinne Maloney before he leaves for China to work on a case for his law firm, and she accepts. Corinne vehemently dislikes Sonny because he constantly teases her about her former job at Hooters.

The next day, Sonny wakes up to find Julian McGrath, a five-year-old left at their apartment. A note states that his mother is no longer able to care for him and that Kevin is his biological father. Sonny contacts Kevin, who is puzzled by the news. Despite his selfishness and lack of parenting skills, Sonny assures him that he will take care of Julian until Kevin returns from China. To win Vanessa back, Sonny introduces her to Julian. However, he discovers that she is now dating Sid, an elderly man whom, despite being 36 years older than her, she reveres as more motivated and intelligent, with a "five-year plan".

Posing as Kevin, Sonny takes Julian to his social worker Arthur Brooks, telling him that Julian should return to his mother. However, Brooks informs Sonny that Julian's mother died of cancer. Sonny then decides to raise Julian his own way. They develop a strong bond, and Julian helps Sonny find a new girlfriend in Corinne's lawyer sister Layla. Brooks finds a foster home for Julian and leaves messages for Sonny, but is suspicious when he does not respond.

At a meeting at Julian's school, Sonny rethinks his parenting methods after Julian's teacher complains about the habits he has developed due to Sonny's influence. He turns Julian's behavior around, but then Brooks arrives to find out Sonny impersonated Kevin, and threatens to arrest him if he does not hand over Julian. Sonny complies but contacts Layla to help take legal action.

In court, numerous people, including Corinne, testify on Sonny's behalf and tell the judge he is a good father. Julian also testifies and provides information regarding his heritage. Sonny then calls himself to the stand and asks his lawyer father Lenny, visiting from Florida, to question him. Despite Lenny's fervent belief that he is not father material, Sonny convinces him that he will not fail at being a father. Impressed by Sonny's sincerity, Lenny vouches for him. Nonetheless, the unconvinced judge orders Sonny's arrest. Kevin, realizing he truly is Julian's biological father, refuses to press charges against Sonny. Kevin is granted custody of Julian, and Sonny promises him that he will always be there for him. He then passes Julian to Kevin, and they start to bond.
 
One year later, Sonny has completely turned his life around: he is a successful lawyer, is married to Layla, and they have a child of their own. Sonny is given a surprise birthday party at a Hooters, attended by his friends, including Julian, who is happy in his new family with Kevin and Corinne (and often meets up with Sonny for activities, such as basketball). Sonny then encounters Vanessa working there as a waitress with Sid working as a cook, revealing that his "five-year plan" did not go as she had hoped. Everyone but a frustrated Vanessa celebrates Sonny's birthday.

Cast
 Adam Sandler as Sonny Koufax, an unmotivated slacker who works in a tollbooth, despite having his law degree, and becomes Julian's guardian.
 Joey Lauren Adams as Layla Maloney, a lawyer, and Corinne's sister. She becomes Sonny's new girlfriend.
 Jon Stewart as Kevin Gerrity, Sonny's roommate and Julian's biological father, which he realizes was the result of a one-night-stand in Toronto.
 Leslie Mann as Corinne Maloney, a podiatrist and Kevin's fiancé. Sonny frequently teases her about her past as a Hooters waitress during college.
 Rob Schneider as Nazo: The delivery guy from Cozy's and Sonny's best friend.
 Dylan and Cole Sprouse as Julian "Frankenstein" McGrath-Gerrity, the biological son of Kevin who was sent to live with his father after the death of his biological mother.
 Jonathan Loughran as Mike, a lawyer friend of Sonny's.
 Allen Covert as Phil D'Amato, a lawyer friend of Sonny's, and Tommy's boyfriend.
 Peter Dante as Tommy Grayton, a lawyer friend of Sonny's, and Phil's boyfriend. 
 Kristy Swanson as Vanessa, Sonny's ex-girlfriend, a party planner, who seeks an "oriented and focused" man.
 Joseph Bologna as Lenny Koufax, Sonny's father, who Sonny describes as "one of the most respected lawyers in the state of Florida," and who chastises Sonny for his lack of motivation.
 Steve Buscemi as a homeless man, who ran away from his father, an Army veteran, and keeps encountering Sonny, who owes him a Sausage McMuffin after promising him one when he and Julian went to McDonald's for breakfast.
 Josh Mostel as Arthur Brooks, Julian's social worker.
 Edmund Lyndeck as Mr. Herlihy, an older drunk regular at Blarney's, who constantly teases Sonny for "fighting like a girl".
 Geoffrey Horne as Sid, Vanessa's new boyfriend, an older man who Vanessa boasts as having a "five-year plan".
 Jackie Sandler as a waitress at Blarney's, a bar that Sonny frequents.
 Helen Lloyd Breed as Ms. Foote.
 Chloé Hult as a teacher.
 Jared Sandler as Jared.
 Jillian Sandler as Jillian.
 Carmen De Lavallade as a judge.
 Steven Brill as Castellucci, Brooks' legal representative.
Harold Olena as Diver Dan

Production

Principal Photography took place in New York from September 24 to December 21, 1998.

Reception

Critical response
On Rotten Tomatoes, Big Daddy has an approval rating of 39% based on 93 reviews, and an average rating of 4.9/10. The site's critical consensus reads, "Adam Sandler acquits himself admirably, but his charm isn't enough to make up for Big Daddy'''s jarring shifts between crude humor and mawkish sentimentality." On Metacritic the film has a weighted average score of 41 out of 100, based on reviews from 26 critics, indicating "mixed or average reviews". Audiences surveyed by CinemaScore gave the film a grade B+.

Nathan Rabin of The A.V. Club called it "Sandler's best movie", noting that "Sandler possesses an innocence that makes the mean-spiritedness inherent in much of his work surprisingly palatable." Robert Koehler of Variety called it "a step forward for Adam Sandler, as well as a strategy to expand his audience. While the loyal male-teen aud[ience] core will not be disappointed with the spate of gags just for them, story contains solid date-movie material."

Kenneth Turan of the Los Angeles Times said: "There's no doubt Sandler is talented, but if he persists in believing that, like Elvis, his presence alone covers a multitude of omissions and inconsistencies, he will squander his gift and make a series of forgettable films in the process." Roger Ebert of the Chicago Sun-Times'' gave the film one-and-a-half out of four stars, describing the main character as "seriously disturbed" and the story as "predictable", although he did praise Joey Lauren Adams's character as "entertaining".

Director Paul Thomas Anderson is a noted fan of the film, considering it one of his favorites.

Accolades

Soundtrack

The film won a BMI Film Music Award. The soundtrack included the following:

Track listing  
 "Sweet Child o' Mine" by Sheryl Crow (Guns N' Roses cover)
 "When I Grow Up" by Garbage
 "Peace Out" by Adam Sandler (a sound clip from a scene in the movie)
 "Just Like This" by Limp Bizkit
 "Only Love Can Break Your Heart" by Everlast (a Neil Young cover)
 "Ga Ga" by Melanie C
 "What Is Life" by George Harrison, covered in movie by Shawn Mullins
 "The Kiss" by Adam Sandler (a sound clip from a scene in the movie)
 "Instant Pleasure" by Rufus Wainwright
 "Ooh La La" by The Wiseguys
 "Sid" by Adam Sandler (a sound clip from a scene in the movie)
 "If I Can't Have You" by Yvonne Elliman
 "Smelly Kid" by Adam Sandler (a sound clip from a scene in the movie)
 "Passin' Me By" by The Pharcyde (a sound clip from a scene in the movie)
 "Rush" by Big Audio Dynamite
 "Hooters" by Allen Covert (a sound clip from a scene in the movie)
 "Babe" by Styx
 "Overtime" by Adam Sandler (a sound clip from a scene in the movie)
 "The Kangaroo Song" by Tim Herlihy (made specifically for the movie)
 "The Best of Times" by Styx (only a portion of the song)

Other songs used in the film
 "Dancing in the Moonlight" by The CrownSayers (originally done by King Harvest)
 "Sweet Dreams (Are Made of This)" by Eurythmics
 "Sweet Child o' Mine" a re-recorded version taken from a live version played by Guns N' Roses mixed with a recording with the 1999 Guns N' Roses lineup.
 "Jump" by Van Halen background music on the answering machine message in Sonny's apartment
 "Growin' Up" by Bruce Springsteen
 "Save It For Later" by Harvey Danger (originally by The English Beat)
 "Blue Collar Man (Long Nights)" by Styx
 "Night's Interlude" by Nightmares on Wax (Song played during opening credits)
 "Fooled Around and Fell in Love" by Elvin Bishop

Songs from the theatrical trailer not in the film
 "Doo Wa Ditty (Blow That Thing)" by Zapp and Roger
 "You Get What You Give" by New Radicals

References

External links

 
 
 
 

1999 films
1990s American films
Columbia Pictures films
1990s English-language films
1999 comedy films
American comedy films
Films about father–son relationships
Films about adoption
Films about parenting
American LGBT-related films
1999 LGBT-related films
Films directed by Dennis Dugan
Films scored by Teddy Castellucci
Films set in New York City
Films shot in New York City
Films with screenplays by Adam Sandler
Films with screenplays by Tim Herlihy
Golden Raspberry Award winning films